Peren Legislative Assembly constituency is one of the 60 Legislative Assembly constituencies of Nagaland state in India.

It is part of Peren District and is reserved for candidates belonging to the Scheduled Tribes.

Members of the Legislative Assembly

Election results

2018 
}}

2013 
}}

2008 
}}

See also
 List of constituencies of the Nagaland Legislative Assembly
 Peren district

References

Peren district
Assembly constituencies of Nagaland